Street Fight may refer to:

Street fighting, hand-to-hand fighting in public places
Urban warfare, military conflict in built-up areas
Street Fight (film), a 2005 documentary about the 2002 Newark, New Jersey mayoral election
Coonskin (film), a 1975 animated film, re-released under the title Street Fight
"Street Fight" (song), a 2007 song by Hedley
A name used for hardcore wrestling-based variations of professional wrestling match types
Street Fight Radio, an anarchist political comedy radio show and podcast founded in 2011

See also
Street Fighter (disambiguation)